The 1966–67 Iowa Hawkeyes men's basketball team represented the University of Iowa in intercollegiate basketball during the 1966–67 season. The team was led by Ralph Miller and played their home games at the Iowa Field House. The Hawkeyes finished the season 16–8 and were 9-5 in Big Ten conference games.

Roster

Schedule/results

|-
!colspan=9 style=| Non-Conference Regular Season

|-
!colspan=9 style=| Big Ten Regular Season

References

Iowa Hawkeyes men's basketball seasons
Iowa
Hawkeyes
Hawkeyes